Coleocephalus is a genus of land planarians that currently contains a single species, Coleocephalus fuscus, from Enderby Island, New Zealand.

Description 
The genus Coleocephalus is characterized by an anterior end that is curved downwards and partially covers an oval glandular area on the ventral surface. This glandular area has a folded epithelium with gland cells and openings of glands from the mesenchyme. The copulatory apparatus has adenodactyls and a penis papilla.

References 

Geoplanidae
Rhabditophora genera
Worms of New Zealand
Fauna of the Auckland Islands